The Nassau County Museum of Art (NCMA) is located  east of New York City on the former Frick "Clayton" Estate, a  property in Roslyn Harbor in the heart of Long Island’s Gold Coast.  The main museum building, named in honor of art collectors and philanthropists Arnold A. Saltzman and his wife Joan, is a three-story Georgian-style mansion that exemplifies Gold Coast architecture of the late 19th century. In addition to the mansion, NCMA, which receives nearly 200,000 visitors each year, includes The Manes Family Art & Education Center, opened in 2017, as well as a Sculpture Park, a Formal Garden, rare specimen trees and marked walking trails.

Overview
NCMA annually presents major rotating exhibitions, many of which are original to the museum and are organized by the museum’s own curatorial staff. The museum's exhibitions have reached across a broad spectrum of artistic concerns—from European and American art movements, to epochs of American and European history, to the influences of one art form or another  and to the impact of Long Island artists on art and design. In addition to these major exhibitions, NCMA mounts exhibitions of work by contemporary artists in the Manes Center gallery.

NCMA’s collection of more than 600 art objects spans American and European art of the 19th and 20th centuries. Encompassing all types of media, the collection includes works by Auguste Rodin,  Édouard Vuillard, Pierre Bonnard, Roy Lichtenstein, Larry Rivers, Robert Rauschenberg, Chaim Gross, Moses Soyer, Audrey Flack, Frank Stella, Barbara Prey, George Segal and Alex Katz among many others.

NCMA's 145 acres constitute one of the largest publicly accessible sculpture gardens on the East Coast. Among the more than 30 sculptures sited on the property to interact with the natural environment are works by Tom Otterness, Fernando Botero, Chaim Gross, Alejandro Colunga, Masayuki Nagare, Richard Serra, Manolo Valdes Mark DiSuvero and many others.

The museum's gardens and walking trails are also notable. Commissioned in 1925 by Frances Frick, an avid horticulturist and garden club member, the Frick Estate’s Formal Gardens have been restored to the original design of the famed landscape architect, Marian Cruger Coffin. Coffin considered these Formal Gardens to be among her finest creations. In recent years, the historic garden trellis and water tower have been restored to original condition. Additionally, many pathways through the 145-acre property are now marked as guided nature trails.

History
The land that eventually became the museum grounds was previously the undeveloped portion of Cedarmere, poet William Cullen Bryant's retreat from his busy life in New York City. In the 1890s, his family sold all but seven acres to former congressman Lloyd Bryce, who hired Ogden Codman, Jr. to build a Georgian Revival mansion on the high ground in the middle of the property, overlooking nearby Hempstead Harbor.

In 1919, Bryant’s heirs sold the estate to Henry Clay Frick, the co-founder of U.S. Steel, for his son, Childs Frick. The architect Sir Charles Carrick Allom was commissioned to redesign the facade and much of the interior. The Fricks named their home "Clayton".

Childs Frick, his wife Frances and their four children lived at Clayton for almost 50 years, until his death in 1965. The county bought the estate four years later and converted it into a museum, called the Nassau County Museum of Art. In 1989, NCMA became a private not-for-profit institution and since then has been governed and funded by a private board of trustees which includes many of Long Island’s most prominent business, civic and social leaders.

The Fine Arts Museum of Long Island, which spun off from the Nassau County Museum of Art, operated from 1978 to current.

Past exhibitions 

Surrealism, September 2000 and May 2007
Reflections of Opulence, May 2001
A Century of Prints, March 2003
La Belle Epoque, June 2003
European Art Between the Wars, May 2004
Picasso, February 2005
Picasso and the School of Paris, November 2006
Pop and Op, February 2008
The Subject is Women: Impressionism and Post-Impressionism, January 2010
The Revolutionary War, January 2000
Napoleon And His Age, January 2001
Window on the West, February 2002
The World of Theodore Roosevelt, November 2002
The WPA Era, August 2004
The American Spirit: Paintings by Mort Künstler, August 2006
Napoleon and Eugenie, June 2009
Dance, Dance, Dance, June 2000
Explosive Photography/Photorealism, January 2004
Geoffrey Holder: A Life in Art, Theater and Dance, November 2007
The Hamptons Since Pollock, April 2000
Tiffany and the Gilded Age, September 2008
Jim Dine, March 2012
Chagall, July 2012
Alex Katz, June 2013
Peter Max, October 2013
Photorealism, July 2014
China Then and Now, November 2014
Out of the Vault, March 2015

References

External links 
 Museum website

Roslyn Harbor, New York
Houses completed in 1901
Art museums established in 1969
Sculpture gardens, trails and parks in New York (state)
Town of North Hempstead, New York
Art museums and galleries in New York (state)
Museums in Nassau County, New York
Children's museums in New York (state)
1969 establishments in New York (state)
Georgian Revival architecture in New York (state)